Skyy is the debut  album released by New York City based  group Skyy released in 1979  on  Salsoul Records.

Track listing

Personnel
Randy Muller - Flute, Keyboards, Percussion
Solomon Roberts, Jr. - Drums, Guitar, Vocals
Gerald Lebon - Bass
Tommy McConnell - Drums
Anibal "Butch" Sierra - Guitar
Larry Greenberg - Keyboards
Bonny Dunning, Delores Dunning, Denise Dunning Crawford - Vocals

Additional Personnel
Andrew Langston - Keyboards
Kevin Davis - Congas
Gerald Lebon - Vocals (on Disco Dancin')
Irving Spice Boys - Strings

Charts

Singles

References

External links
 Skyy-Skyy at Discogs

1979 debut albums
Skyy (band) albums
Salsoul Records albums